Kristoff St. John (July 15, 1966 – February 3, 2019) was an American actor best known for playing Neil Winters on the CBS daytime soap opera The Young and the Restless from 1991 until his death in 2019, which earned him two Daytime Emmy Award from eleven nominations, and ten NAACP Image Awards. He was also known for his role as Adam Marshall in the NBC soap opera Generations, for which he received two Daytime Emmy Award nominations; and his role as a young Alex Haley on ABC miniseries Roots: The Next Generations.

Early life 
Kristoff St. John was born July 15, 1966, in New York City and grew up in Bridgeport, Connecticut, and Los Angeles. His father, Christopher St. John, is a producer, actor and director, while his mother, Marie, is an entertainer.

Career
As a ten-year-old child, St. John had a featuring role on the Saturday-morning comedy Big John, Little John, broadcast on NBC in 1976. St. John portrayed a young Alex Haley in the 1979 ABC miniseries Roots: The Next Generations. He also made a small appearance as Booker Brown on the ABC sitcom Happy Days, as well as a boyfriend of Denise Huxtable on an early episode of The Cosby Show. In his first major role, he appeared as Charlie Richmond Jr. in the 1985 CBS sitcom Charlie & Co.

St. John's first major soap role was Adam Marshall on the NBC soap opera, Generations. After the show's cancellation in 1991, he originated the role of Neil Winters on The Young and the Restless, and played the character for 28 years; no African American actor had appeared on the series more frequently than St. John. In 1992, he won the Daytime Emmy Award for Outstanding Younger Actor in a Drama Series for his role. On September 5, 1994, he hosted CBS Soap Break.

In 2005, St. John became a special host for TV Guide Channel. In 2007, he received his fifth Daytime Emmy nomination. He was nominated for Outstanding Supporting Actor. In 2008, St. John won his second Daytime Emmy, as Outstanding Supporting Actor in a Drama Series.

In 2014, A Man Called God, a documentary that St. John co-directed with his father Christopher St. John, debuted at the San Diego Black Film Festival. The film was awarded there, and at other festivals such as the American Documentary Film Festival, and the Beverly Hills Film Festival.

Kristoff's final appearance as Neil aired on February 6, 2019. Late in April, it was revealed that Neil had died of a stroke.

Personal life 
St. John was married and divorced twice. He had a son Julian (1989–2014) and a daughter Paris Nicole (born 1992) with his first wife, boxer Mia St. John. Julian died by suicide on November 23, 2014, following a long history of mental illness. St. John was married to Allana Nadal from 2001 to 2007, and they had a daughter, Lola (born April 15, 2003). On August 31, 2018, he was engaged to Russian model Kseniya Olegovna Mikhaleva.

St. John was a vegan and animal rights advocate; he appeared in two PETA ad campaigns.

St. John died at his Los Angeles, California, home on February 3, 2019, at age 52. His death was ruled accidental with the cause listed as hypertrophic cardiomyopathy.

Filmography

Awards

References

External links

 
 
 
 

1966 births
2019 deaths
Accidental deaths in California
Male actors from New York City
African-American male actors
American male child actors
American male soap opera actors
Burials at Valley Oaks Memorial Park
Daytime Emmy Award winners
Daytime Emmy Award for Outstanding Supporting Actor in a Drama Series winners
Daytime Emmy Award for Outstanding Younger Actor in a Drama Series winners
American male television actors
20th-century American male actors
21st-century American male actors
20th-century African-American people
21st-century African-American people
Deaths from cardiomyopathy